Band-e Amir or Band Amir or Bandamir in Iran, may refer to:
 Band-e Amir, Fars
 Band-e Amir, Markazi
 Band-e Amir Rural District, in Fars Province